The Santa Clara Broncos men's basketball team represents Santa Clara University in NCAA Division I basketball competition. The team plays home games at the Leavey Center in Santa Clara, California and have been members of the West Coast Conference since its formation in 1952. The team is currently coached by Herb Sendek, who had previously been the head coach at NC State and Arizona State. Sendek was hired on March 29, 2016.

Santa Clara has a long history of basketball success, having appeared in 11 NCAA Tournaments and 6 National Invitational Tournaments and producing a number of both collegiate All-Americans and NBA players. The 2010–11 team won the 2011 CollegeInsider.com Tournament, and the 2012–13 team won the 2013 College Basketball Invitational. They are currently the only team to have won a CBI and a CIT.

More recently, the Broncos have returned to the NIT in both 2022 and 2023.

History
Basketball made its inauspicious debut at Santa Clara in 1904 with a 9–7 victory over Alameda High School. Later that year, Santa Clara played its first intercollegiate game, a loss to the University of the Pacific, then located just down the road from Santa Clara. Early schedules composed of high school and YMCA opponents gave way to wholly intercollegiate schedules, and by 1916, the Broncos were matching up with teams like Stanford, USC, and Nevada, in addition to traditional arch-rivals San Francisco and St. Mary's. Santa Clara has long been blessed with a series of long-tenured coaches; since 1935, only seven different men have coached the Broncos.

The first long-tenured coach of Santa Clara was Harlan Dykes, who led the team to a 101–48 record. Much like the university football team, the Broncos played many home games in San Francisco, both at Kezar Pavilion and at the Civic Center.

More sustained success for Santa Clara came under Head Coach George Barsi, whose tenure spanned from 1935 to 1945. Barsi was a graduate of Santa Clara in 1930. Barsi's "Magicians of the Maplewood" included future Warriors Head Coach Bob Feerick as well as Santa Clara's first All-American, Ralph "Toddy" Giannini. The Broncos dazzled crowds in excess of 20,000 at Madison Square Garden and defeated City College of New York and La Salle University by 20 points apiece during an exhibition match-up. Santa Clara was among the first teams to shoot one-handed or run the fast break.

Some of Santa Clara earliest basketball stars, like Bruce Hale, Dick O'Keefe, and Stan Patrick, played in the NBL, the forerunner to the modern NBA.

Following the post-war period, former Santa Clara star Bob Feerick returned to coach the Broncos. Under his guidance, the Broncos advanced to the 1952 Final Four, as well as Elite Eight trips in 1953 and 1954. Santa Clara forward Ken Sears appeared on the cover of the new Sports Illustrated in December 1954, becoming the first basketball player, college or pro, to do so. After leading the Broncos back to the NCAA tournament in 1960, Feerick left Santa Clara in 1962 to coach the NBA's San Francisco Warriors, who had just relocated from Philadelphia.

His 1968 squad finished at 27–2, dropping only one regular season game, to local rival San Jose State. Led on the court  by Bud Ogden and Dennis Awtrey, Santa Clara reached as high as second in the AP poll. The Broncos also appeared in the NCAA tournament in 1967 and 1969. In a three-year period, they compiled a  record.

Garibaldi resigned in the summer of 1970 to work for Converse shoes, and Carroll Williams became the longest tenured coach in Santa Clara's basketball history, leading the Broncos from 1970 to 1991. He led the team to a  record. Despite the sustained success, Williams took the Broncos to an NCAA tournament only once (1987); in addition, the team reached the NIT in 1984, 1985, and 1989. Williams' tenure produced two of Santa Clara's most memorable players, Kurt Rambis and Nick Vanos, the former remembered for his time with the Lakers and the latter remembered for his untimely death shortly after entering the NBA. Both players would have their numbers retired.

Dick Davey became the head coach in 1992, after serving as an assistant for many years. He experienced immediate success, thanks to a young Canadian point guard, Steve Nash, who led the Broncos to three NCAA tournaments in 1993, 1995, and 1996. In 1993, the fifteenth-seeded Broncos upset second-seeded (and #5) Arizona, becoming the second team to do so. Nash went on to become Santa Clara's most decorated player at the professional level, twice winning the NBA MVP award.

Following the 2006 season, Davey retired under controversial circumstances, as it appeared some boosters had pushed hard for his retirement. Davey compiled  overall record, and a  record in West Coast Conference play. He won three straight regular season WCC titles and one WCC tournament.

He was replaced by Kerry Keating, an assistant coach from UCLA. In nine seasons at the helm of the Broncos, Keating led the Broncos to both CBI and CIT championships, but was unable to take the Broncos to the NCAA tournament or finish better than 4th in the WCC. Keating is the only coach to post a lifetime losing record in conference play with Santa Clara. On March 7, 2016, Keating was fired by Santa Clara.

Three weeks later, Santa Clara announced the hiring of Herb Sendek, whose head coaching experience included time at Miami University, North Carolina State, and Arizona State. Sendek's resume includes trips to the NIT or NCAA tournament in 18 of his 22 seasons as a head coach. In 2022, Santa Clara returned to the NIT for the first time since the 1980s, and saw Jalen Williams drafted 12th overall, the first Bronco selected in the NBA draft since Steve Nash.

Rivalries

Santa Clara maintains a number of rivalries, most of which are almost a century old. Santa Clara's most heated rivals have traditionally been the other Bay Area WCC members, San Francisco and Saint Mary's. All WCC members are treated like rivals, as are all four in-state members of the Pac-12.

San Francisco Dons
Santa Clara and San Francisco first met in 1908, and have met 211 times since. Santa Clara has leads the series, 111–101. As two comparably sized Jesuit institutions within an hours drive of each other, the Broncos and Dons are natural rivals. The rivalry was heightened in the 1950s, with Santa Clara advancing to the Final Four in 1952, and San Francisco winning the tournament in 1954 and 1955. In a time when the NCAA tournament field was limited to 16 teams, the winner of the rivalry series was often the WCAC representative. The rivalry has remained competitive to the present day, however, it has lost some of its luster following San Francisco's self-imposed death penalty in 1981. Up to that point, the Dons had been one of college basketball's powerhouses, and the Broncos had played the role of foil. Santa Clara has won a majority of the match-up since the San Francisco program was revived in 1985.

San Jose State Spartans
San Jose State and Santa Clara first played in 1909, and Santa Clara leads the all-time series, 82–32. The rivalry between the two schools was formalized in 2002 as the Rivalry Series which compiled point totals in men's and women's soccer, men's and women's basketball, men's and women's golf, men's and women's cross-country, baseball, softball, and women's volleyball, tennis and water polo.

Saint Mary’s Gaels
Saint Mary’s and Santa Clara first played in 1910, and Santa Clara leads the all-time series, 131–83. The rivalry between the two schools has been most intense in football, and was less competitive in basketball. However, with both schools dropping football and Saint Mary’s recent rise to prominence in basketball have heightened the rivalry.

Pacific Tigers
Santa Clara and Pacific own the oldest intercollegiate basketball rivalry in California, with the series beginning in 1904. Santa Clara leads the all-time series 89–51. The rivalry was initially one of proximity, as Pacific was founded in Santa Clara and later moved to San Jose. When the basketball rivalry began, the schools were located a stone’s throw from one another. When Pacific relocated to Stockton in 1923, the rival lessened somewhat. Pacific was a founding member, along with Santa Clara, of the WCAC conference in 1952. However, the rivalry took another hit when Pacific moved to the 1971 to join the Big West Conference. However, the teams remained fixtures on one another’s schedules. With Pacific returning to the WCC in 2013, the rivalry will take-on renewed significance.

Stanford Cardinal
Stanford and Santa Clara first met in 1912, and Stanford leads the all-time series 51–25. Both universities are in Santa Clara County, and have long shared a rivalry on and off the court. The two teams have not met on the court since 2008. Former Bronco head coach Dick Davy served as an assistant at Stanford from 2008–2012 following his retirement as head coach of Santa Clara in 2007. Santa Clara’s Kevin Foster passed Stanford’s Todd Lichti as the leading scorer in Bay Area college basketball history. The series is set to resume in 2019.

Gonzaga Bulldogs
A newer rivalry for the Broncos has been with the Gonzaga Bulldogs. The teams first met in 1946, but did not become regular competitors until Gonzaga joined the West Coast Conference in 1979. Gonzaga leads the all-time series 49–31. In 2007, Santa Clara became the first, and to date, one of only two WCC members to beat Gonzaga in the McCarthey Athletic Center. In 2012, the attendance at the Santa Clara-Gonzaga game was 4,907, a Leavey Center record.

Postseason

NCAA tournament results

The Broncos have appeared in 11 NCAA Tournaments. Their combined record is 11–13.

The Broncos win over Arizona in 1993 was the second time in tournament history that a 15 seed has upset a 2 seed.

NIT results

The Broncos have appeared in six National Invitation Tournaments. Their combined record is 2–6.

CBI results

The Broncos have appeared in one College Basketball Invitational. Their record is 5–1 and were the 2013 champions.

CIT results

The Broncos have appeared in one CollegeInsider.com Tournament. Their record is 5–0 and were the 2011 champions.

Individual honors

All-Americans
Ralph Giannini (1939–40)
Bob Feerick (1941–42)
Ken Sears (1954–55)
Bud Ogden (1969–69)
Dennis Awtrey (1969–70)
Mike Stewart (1971–72)
Steve Nash (1995–96)
John Bryant (2008–09)

Conference Players of the Year
Ken Sears (1953, 1955)
Dennis Awtrey (1969, 1970)
Mike Stewart (1972)
Kurt Rambis (1980)
Steve Nash (1995, 1996)
Marlon Garnett (1997)
Sean Denison (2007)
John Bryant (2009)

Retired numbers

Facilities

San Francisco Years

The earliest Santa Clara Bronco home games were played at the San Jose YMCA, located down the Alameda from the campus. By 1927, however, the Broncos had adopted Kezar Pavilion, about 50 miles north of campus in San Francisco, as their home arena. In 1932, the Broncos began splitting time between the San Francisco Civic Center and Kezar. Though it may seem strange in a modern context to play games so far from campus, before the post-war boom, the vast majority of the Bay Area's population lived in San Francisco, and with them, the majority of Santa Clara's alumni and fans. Santa Clara's campus was considered rural and isolated at the time. With the Construction of the Seifert Gymnasium on campus in 1935, some less marquee match-ups were scheduled to be played on campus, much to the delight of the student body.

San Jose Civic Auditorium
With its construction in 1935, San Jose finally had a building worthy of hosting intercollegiate basketball. Though the Broncos would still play 'home' games in San Francisco intermittently until 1951, San Jose Civic became Santa Clara's true home. The San Jose Civic Auditorium was designed for stage productions, giving the building a unique feeling during basketball games. Those sitting on the ground floor had an intimate view of the game, and opposing students were often state on opposite sides of the balconies. During the Second World War, due to wartime travel restrictions, most home games were played at the smaller, on-campus, Seifert Gymnasium.

Toso Pavilion
Following Santa Clara's successful run in the late 1960s, boosters and fans clamored to move the team to a modern, spacious, on-campus home. The Civic Auditorium was small for major college basketball tenant, and scheduling was made difficult by sharing the space with both concerts and productions, as well as the rival San Jose State Spartants basketball team, who also called the venue home. With funds raised, Santa Clara began construction on Toso Pavilion in 1974. Once it was completed in 1975, the Broncos moved, for the first time, to an on-campus home with modern amenities. The facility featured an air supported vinyl fabric roof supported by 11 large fans constantly producing a higher air pressure inside the dome than outside, similar to the Pontiac Silverdome or BC Place Stadium. The inside of the facility featured the main activity floor, two recreation areas, and team locker rooms. The building was named for Hal Toso, a basketball player at Santa Clara in the 1920s, and a major donor, supporter, and member of the Santa Clara Athletic Hall of Fame.

Leavey Center
The roof of Toso Pavilion developed several tears, and by 2000, the decision was made to renovate the building. A more permanent roof structure was built, and the interior of the building was renovated and brought to modern standards at a cost of $14 million. The newly christened Leavey Center was named for Thomas Leavey, a 1922 Santa Clara Alumnus who founded Farmers Insurance. The Leavey Center contains the whole of the Athletic Department, and locker rooms for all team, excluding baseball, are in the building. The Capacity was reduced from 5,000 seats to a listed capacity of 4,500 with the renovation, due to the addition of chairback seats. However, larger crowds have been known to watch the Broncos play, with 4,907 on hand to watch the Santa Clara-Gonzaga game in 2012. The Leavey Center has also played host to nine West Coast Conference Basketball championships, most recently in 2005.

Other off campus venues
Santa Clara has been known to host games against some opponents at off-campus sites to accommodate larger crowds. In 2004, Santa Clara upset No. 3 North Carolina 77–66 at Oracle Arena. Santa Clara has also hosted Kansas, San Jose State, and others at the SAP Center, which is located on Santa Clara Street in downtown San Jose, only a few miles from campus.

References

External links